Kavas is a surname. Notable people with this surname include:

 Boštjan Kavaš (born 1978), Slovenian handball player
 George Kavas (born 1995), Greek sailor
 Neslihan Kavas (born 1987), Turkish para table tennis player

See also